Tilton is a community located north west of Bay Roberts. The first postmaster was Thomas E. Greeley. The population was 377 in 1956. The community is now a part of the town of Spaniard's Bay. As of 2023, Tilton has a population of around 440 people.

See also
List of communities in Newfoundland and Labrador

Former towns in Newfoundland and Labrador
Populated coastal places in Canada
Populated places in Newfoundland and Labrador